Aiki Framework is a PHP + MYSQL (LAMP) web application framework that allows designers and programmers to create and work with existing content management systems from the web. The Fabricatorz global production company was its commercial steward and has used it to build Open Clip Art Library 3.0 and the now public Open Font Library. Both sites using Aiki Framework were publicly announced at Libre Graphics Meeting 2011.

Status 
The last release of the software approximately coincided with the March 15, 2012 detainment in Syria of the technology's inventor, Bassel Khartabil. Aiki Framework was for a long time  the underlying technology of the Open Clip Art Library and still is for Open Font Library, but the technology was deprecated since 2016 when it was resurrected and put on GitHub. The history of changes was imported to git from last zip file taken from archive.org and controlled by bazaar version control.

Usage 
The goal of Aiki Framework is to make a fast system for developing heavily trafficked communities where developers are used to editing source code, but can not directly because of necessary security precautions in running a web server.

Examples 
 Open Clip Art Library
 Open Font Library

Participants 
 Christopher Adams
 Dave Crossland
 Steven Garcia
 Brad Phillips
 Jon Phillips
 Bassel Safadi
 Barry Threw
 Jakub T. Jankiewicz

Bassel Khartabil 
On 1 August 2017, it was reported that the inventor of Aiki, Bassel Khartabil (known as Bassel Safadi), had been executed in prison by the Syrian government.

References

External links 

 

Free content management systems
PHP frameworks
Content management systems
Website management
Document management systems
Software using the GNU AGPL license